Jiang Tao (born 16 April 1970) is a Chinese former amateur boxer. He participated in the 1996 Summer Olympics (Heavyweight - 91 kg division) where he defeated Uganda's Charles Kizza 10–7 before losing to American Nate Jones 4–21 in the quarterfinal. He was also the heavyweight champion at the 1995 Asian Amateur Boxing Championships and a bronze medalist at the 1994 Asian Games.

References

1970 births
Boxers at the 1996 Summer Olympics
Olympic boxers of China
Chinese male boxers
Heavyweight boxers
People from Jinzhai County
Sportspeople from Anhui
Living people
Asian Games medalists in boxing
Asian Games bronze medalists for China
Boxers at the 1994 Asian Games
Medalists at the 1994 Asian Games
20th-century Chinese people